Sir Marc Feldmann,   (born 2 December 1944), is an Australian-educated British immunologist. He is a professor at the University of Oxford and a senior research fellow at Somerville College, Oxford.

Biography
Feldmann was born 2 December 1944 in Lvov to a Jewish family who managed to get to France immediately postwar.  He emigrated from France to Australia at age eight. After graduating with an MBBS degree from the University of Melbourne in 1967, he earned a Ph.D. in Immunology at the Walter and Eliza Hall Institute of Medical Research in 1972 with Sir Gustav Nossal.

He moved to London in the 1970s, working first with  Avrion Mitchison at the Imperial Cancer Research Fund's Tumour Immunology Unit; in 1985 he moved to the Charing Cross Sunley Research Centre and the Kennedy Institute of Rheumatology (which joined with the Faculty of Medicine at Imperial College in 2000; in August 2011 the  Institute transferred to the University of Oxford.

Research 
In the 1980s he published an hypothesis for the mechanism of induction of autoimmune diseases, highlighting the role of cytokines.  This model was validated in experiments with thyroid disease tissue.  From 1984 he collaborated with Ravinder N. Maini at the Kennedy Institute of Rheumatology to study disease mechanism in rheumatoid arthritis, an autoimmune disease affecting 1% of the population.

Feldmann's group demonstrated that diseased joints have far more pro-inflammatory cytokines than normal, and postdoctoral researcher Fionula Brennan identified one of these, tumour necrosis factor alpha, (abbreviated TNFα) as the key.

Blocking TNFα reduced levels of the other pro-inflammatory cytokines in test-tube models of arthritis, and this provided the rationale for testing TNF blockade in rheumatoid arthritis patients which had failed all existing treatment.

The first of a series of successful clinical trials was performed in 1992 at Charing Cross Hospital, using the antibody infliximab from Centocor, a biotech now part of Johnson and Johnson.

The success led to other companies joining the race to market. By 1998, etanercept (Enbrel) was approved for treatment in the US, and by 1999, infliximab (Remicade) was also approved; there have been multiple additional approved anti-TNF drugs, and they have become standard therapy for stopping the inflammatory and tissue-destructive pathways of rheumatoid arthritis and other autoimmune diseases including Crohn's disease, ulcerative colitis, ankylosing spondylitis, psoriasis and psoriatic arthritis.

Prizes and fellowships
In 2000, Feldmann and Maini were awarded the Crafoord Prize; in 2003, the Albert Lasker Award for Clinical Medical Research;  in 2002, the Cameron Prize for Therapeutics of the University of Edinburgh; in 2008, the Dr. Paul Janssen Award for Biomedical Research; in 2010, the Ernst Schering Prize in Germany; in 2014, the Canada Gairdner International Award.  Feldmann was also awarded the John Curtin Medal of the Australian National University in 2007. In 2020 he received the Tang Prize in Biopharmaceutical Science.

Feldmann is Fellow of the Royal College of Physicians and of the Royal College of Pathologists.  He was elected a Fellow of several national Academies, the Academy of Medical Sciences, the Royal Society of London and is a Corresponding Member of Australian Academy of Science, and a Foreign Member of the National Academy of Sciences, USA.  He was knighted in the 2010 Queen's Birthday Honours.

In 2012 he delivered the Croonian Lecture to the Royal College of Physicians on anti-cytokine therapy.

References

External links
 kennedy.ox.ac.uk
 Publications

1944 births
Living people
Australian immunologists
Australian rheumatologists
Melbourne Medical School alumni
Fellows of the Academy of Medical Sciences (United Kingdom)
Fellows of the Royal Society
Australian people of Polish-Jewish descent
Australian Jews
Polish emigrants to Australia
Knights Bachelor
WEHI alumni
Foreign associates of the National Academy of Sciences
Companions of the Order of Australia
Recipients of the Lasker-DeBakey Clinical Medical Research Award
Fellows of Somerville College, Oxford